Umbrella Games LLC (stylized as umbrella) is an American independent video game developer and publisher founded in March 2015, which commonly develops mobile iOS and Android games.

As of August 2016, they currently have a total of 16 games either developed or published.

Catalog

References

External links 
 

American companies established in 2015
Indie video game developers
Video game companies of the United States
Video game companies established in 2015